The Lalá Marathon (also known as Maraton International LALÁ or Marathon of the Laguna, Lalá) is a 26.2-mile footrace from Gómez Palacio to Torreón, Mexico, first held in 1989. The marathon runs through Torreón's metro area, which is known as "La Laguna," and crosses through the states of Coahuila and Durango. In 2011, Kenyan  set a record for the fastest marathon ever run in Mexico when he ran a 2:08:17.

Course 
Racers finish in the Bosque Venustiano Carranza, a large forested park in the center of the city. The race's finish line features "El Grito Triunfo," a permanent 85-foot-high arch created by local sculptor Mario Talamás Murra.

The course is known for being fast, and it has served as the Mexican Championship race for several years.

The race often draws 5,000 runners from several countries and it is a Boston Marathon qualifier.

The race was first run April 16, 1989. Now it is typically held the first Sunday of March.

Due to the COVID-19 pandemic, the 2021 race was not held, but "virtual" races were offered.

Race Weekend
The weekend offers a 10K, 15K, a half marathon, and the marathon.

Winners

References 

Marathons in North America
Marathons in Mexico